Kudachi Assembly constituency is one of the 224 constituencies in the Karnataka Legislative Assembly of Karnataka a south state of India. Kagwad is also part of Chikkodi Lok Sabha constituency.

Election Results

2018 assembly elections

Members of Legislative Assembly
 2008: Ghatage Shama Bhima, Indian National Congress
 2013: P. Rajeev, BSR Congress
 2018: P. Rajeev, Bharatiya Janata Party

See also
 Raibag Taluk
 Belagavi district
 Chikkodi Lok Sabha constituency
 List of constituencies of Karnataka Legislative Assembly

References

 

Assembly constituencies of Karnataka
Belagavi district